Constantinos Charalambidis (born 25 July 1981) is a Cypriot former professional footballer.

Throughout his career, Charalambidis had managed to become captain of Apoel Nicosia and the Cyprus National Team.

Charalambidis began his career at APOEL, where he remained from 1997-2004, before moving to Greece to play for Panathinaikos from 2004-2007. During that time he enjoyed a one-year loan spell at PAOK in 2006. He also played for Carl Zeiss Jena in Germany before returning home to APOEL in 2008.

During his second spell with APOEL, earned a total of 18 titles, 6 appearances in European competition group stages, and was an important piece to APOEL's run to the quarter-finals of the 2012 UEFA Champions League. APOEL did not renew his contract at the end of the 2016 season and Charalambides stayed in Cyprus for AEK Larnaka.

At the beginning of his first season with the club, he was considered a reserve at AEK Larnaka, but shortly after participating in parties hosted by APOEL's president, AEK Larnaka terminated his contract.

Charalambidis made 93 appearances with the Cypriot national team, scoring 12 goals in total.

Club career

APOEL
He began his career in the 1998–99 season with Cypriot club APOEL where he became a regular, appearing 121 times, and helped lead them to two championship titles on 2002 and 2004. He also won one Cup in 1999 and two Super Cups in 2002 and 2004.

Panathinaikos / PAOK
He then signed a two-and-a-half-year contract with Panathinaikos in the middle the 2004–05 season. Charalambides would make a total of 44 league appearances for Panathinaikos, as well as achieving to participate in the Champions League Group stage in 2005. He was awarded as the best assist man in the Greek League for the year 2005-2006 but in the summer of 2007 the club chose not to renew his contract. In his final season with Panathinaikos, Charalambides spent the first six months of the season on loan to PAOK, where he made 16 league appearances and scored one goal.

Carl Zeiss Jena
In the summer of 2007, Charalambides spent time on trial at English Championship side Cardiff City but eventually signed with German club FC Carl Zeiss Jena, playing in the 2. Bundesliga for the 2007–08 season.

In the first half of the 2007–08 season, Charalambides featured regularly for Carl Zeiss Jena, making 10 starts and 12 total appearances and scoring one goal, but in January 2008 he and the relegation-bound club agreed it was better for both the player and the club to part ways, and the contract was mutually terminated.

APOEL
Not long thereafter, APOEL managed to lure Charalambides back to Cyprus to again play for his former team, and on 27 January he signed a four-year contract with APOEL. Since then he won the 2007–08 Cypriot Cup, the 2008–09 Cypriot First Division and also two Cypriot Super Cups (2008 and 2009) with APOEL. He also appeared in five official 2009–10 UEFA Champions League group stage matches with APOEL.

The next year he won the 2010–11 Cypriot First Division adding another championship title to his honours list. The following season, he appeared in nine 2011–12 UEFA Champions League matches for APOEL and provided three assists to his teammates, in the club's surprising run to the quarter-finals of the competition.

The next season, he won again the 2012–13 Cypriot First Division, which was his 5th league title in his career with APOEL. During the 2013–14 season, he appeared in five 2013–14 UEFA Europa League group stage matches for APOEL and won all the titles in Cyprus, the Cypriot League, the Cypriot Cup and the Cypriot Super Cup.

Charalambides made his only group stage appearance in APOEL's 2014–15 UEFA Champions League campaign on 17 September 2014, coming on as a 79th-minute substitute in his team's 1–0 defeat against FC Barcelona at Camp Nou. In the 2014–15 season, he managed to add two more titles to his collection, as APOEL won again both the Cypriot championship and the cup.

On 15 May 2016, in the match which he lifted the 2015–16 Cypriot First Division trophy as APOEL captain, he announced that it was his farewell appearance to a club where he had spent and captained for his almost entire career, appearing in more than 400 matches in all competitions and winning 18 domestic titles.

AEK Larnaca
On 1 June 2016, Charalambides joined fellow Cypriot First Division club AEK Larnaca on a two-year contract. In October 2017 he ended his long football career.

International career
Charalambides has been a Football Legend and an important player for the Cypriot national team in recent years. He scored twice in their famous 5–2 win over the Republic of Ireland in the Euro 2008 qualifiers in October 2006, and also scored in their 3–1 win over Wales during the same campaign.  The midfielder also scored twice in Cyprus' 4–1 win over Bulgaria in a World Cup qualifying match in October 2009.

International goals
Scores and results list Cyprus' goal tally first.

Honours
APOEL
 Cypriot First Division (8) : 2001–02, 2003–04, 2008–09, 2010–11, 2012–13, 2013–14, 2014–15, 2015–16
 Cypriot Cup (4) : 1998–99, 2007–08, 2013–14, 2014–15
 Cypriot Super Cup (6) : 2002, 2004, 2008, 2009, 2011, 2013

References

External links 
 APOEL official profile
 
 

1981 births
Living people
Cypriot footballers
Cyprus international footballers
Cypriot expatriate footballers
Association football midfielders
Panathinaikos F.C. players
Greek Cypriot people
APOEL FC players
PAOK FC players
Sportspeople from Nicosia
FC Carl Zeiss Jena players
AEK Larnaca FC players
Expatriate footballers in Germany
Cypriot First Division players
Super League Greece players
2. Bundesliga players